This is a list of electoral district results for the 1988 New South Wales state election.

Results by Electoral district

Albury

Ashfield

Auburn

Ballina 

 The new district of Ballina took in areas from the Lismore, which was held by retiring Independent MP Bruce Duncan.

Balmain

Bankstown

Barwon

Bass Hill

Bathurst

Bega

Blacktown

Bligh

Blue Mountains

Broken Hill

Burragorang

Burrinjuck

Cabramatta

Camden

Campbelltown

Canterbury

Carlingford

Castlereagh

Cessnock

Charlestown

Clarence

Coffs Harbour

Coogee

Cronulla

Davidson

Drummoyne

Dubbo

Earlwood

East Hills

Eastwood

Fairfield

Georges River

Gladesville

Gordon

Gosford

Goulburn

Granville

Hawkesbury

Heathcote

Heffron

Hornsby

Hurstville

Illawarra

Keira

Kiama

Kogarah

Ku-ring-gai

Lachlan

Lake Macquarie

Lakemba

Lane Cove

Lismore

Liverpool

Londonderry

Macquarie Fields

Maitland

Manly

Manning

Maroubra

Marrickville

McKell

Middle Harbour

Minchinbury

Miranda

Monaro

Mosman

Mulgoa

Murray

Murrumbidgee

Murwillumbah

Myall Lakes

Newcastle

Northcott

Northern Tablelands

North Shore

Orange

Parramatta

Peats

Penrith

Pittwater

Port Macquarie

Port Stephens

Riverstone

Rockdale

Ryde

Seven Hills

Smithfield

South Coast

Southern Highlands

Strathfield

Sutherland

Swansea

Tamworth

The Entrance

The Hills

Upper Hunter

Vaucluse

Wagga Wagga

Wakehurst

Wallsend

Waratah

Waverley

Wentworthville

Wollongong

Wyong 

 See also 

 Results of the 1988 New South Wales state election (Legislative Council)
 Candidates of the 1988 New South Wales state election
 Members of the New South Wales Legislative Assembly, 1988–1991

 References 

1988 Legislative Assembly